Runtuna (local pronunciation Runntúna) is a locality situated in Nyköping Municipality, Södermanland County, Sweden with 250 inhabitants in 2010.

Elections
Runtuna has an electoral ward part of the Nyköping East constituency. It has also been merged with the electoral district of Ludgo, growing larger during the 1973-2018 period.

References 

Populated places in Södermanland County
Populated places in Nyköping Municipality